Bad Boy is a 1953 autobiography by Jim Thompson.

References

1953 books
Novels by Jim Thompson
English-language books
Autobiographies